Barbieria is a genus of flowering plants in the legume family, Fabaceae.

It belongs to the Phaseoleae tribe of the Faboideae subfamily.

Taxonomy

De Candolle's (1825) Barbieria DC is a monotypic legume genus of questionable affinities, historically having been synonymized with the genus Clitoria, and placed in several tribes, including its own. White (1980) treated Barbieria as a distinct genus in the Panamanian flora. Lackey (1981) concluded it was a member of the genus Clitoria. In addition, he was the first to correctly assign the genus to tribe Phaseoleae subtribe Clitoriinae Benth., with members bearing resupinate (inverted) flowers, a unique trait amongst legumes. Mabberley (1987) and Smith and Lewis (1991) reconfirmed Barbieria as a synonym of Clitoria. 
Species of Clitoria fall into three distinct groups based upon morphology, but one could conclude that they represent three distinct genera. Bentham (1858) concluded that Clitoria would be rendered more natural by retaining these groups together, treating them as section. Baker (1879) elevated two sections to subgenus Clitoria and subgenus Neurocapum (Desv.) Bak. Fantz (1979) agreed with Bentham and elevated the third section to subgenus Bracteria.  Fantz (1996) resegregated Barbieria from Clitoria. He provided a taxonomic key to the genera (Bracteria, Centrosema, Clitoria, Clitoriopsis, Periandra) in subtribe Clitoriinae. He provided over thirty morphological character traits segregating Bracteria and Clitoria in Table 2.

Bracteria pinnata (Pers.) Baill. (Synonyms: Bracteria mayensis Poepp. & Endl. Bracteria polyphylla 
(Poir.) DC, Clitoria pinnata (Pers.) R.H. Smith & G.P. Lewis, Clitoria polyphyllaPoir., Galactia  pinnata Pers.

Erect shrub 1–2.5 m tall, apically a scandent liana. Leaves imparipinnate, leaflets commonly 13–21, oblong to elliptic, 2.5–6 cm long x 1–2.5 cm wide, dark green with micro-uncinate pubescent above, pale with rufo appressed-pilose pubescence below. Inflorescences pseudoracemose, 4–24 cm long; peduncle rufo-pilose. Pedicels 305 mm in flower, 5–7 mm long in fruit. Bracts deltoid-lanceolate, subulate-acuminate, 3–8 mm. Bracteoles lanceolate, subulate-acuminate, dark greenish-yellow becoming reddish-orange, 7-11mm long x 2–3 mm wide. Flowers resupinate papilionaceous, red, 4.5–6 cm long. Calyx dark-vivid red, narrow infundibular, tube 16–22 mm long, 3–5 mm basally expanding to 6–8 mm wide at throat, lobes deltoid-ovate, subulate-acuminate, 8–12 mm long; persistent in fruit. Standard petal brilliant red, paler toward spotted center, blade oblong-lanceolate, 25–33 mm long x 14–17 mm wide, claw 21–24 mm long. Wing petals shorter than keel, red, flaring apically, blade elliptic-oblong 25–33 mm long x 14–17 mm wide, claw 21–24 mm long. Keel petals red, blade elliptic-oblong, weakly falcate, 17–23 mm long x 2.5–5 mm wide. Staminal sheath white, 36–44 mm long, free filaments 6–8 mm; anthers white. Ovary sessile, linear, 8–11 mm long, densely pubescent, trichomes white, ascending-asppressed, to 2 mm long; style 30–43 mm long, flattened, bearded lengthwise, exerted beyond stamens,  geniculate 5–6 mm from distal end. Legume subsessile, linear, ecostate, valves puberulent-hirsute, strongly transversed-impressed between the seeds, spirally-twisting dehiscent. Seeds smooth, transverse oblong.], brownish-black, viscid,4-9 per pod.    		

Barbieria is easily distinguishable from other members of subtribe Clitoriinae by red flowers, wing petals shorter than the keel, subulate0-acuminte bracts, bracteoles, stipules and calyx lobes, the dorsal calyx lobes free to near the base, and 15-21 leaflets.

Barbieria is found in moist soils in secondary growth, roadsides, riverine forests, forest edges or open areas with abundant sun, at elevations of 390-1000m. Distribution is found from Southern Mexico south to Peru, west to Venezuela and Brazil, and in the Caribbean. Plant collectors often cited that the plat was observed rarely in the area sampled. It flowered in March with fruits borne from April through December

References
 Baker, J.G. 1879. Leguminosae, no. 76:Clitoria. In: J.D. Hooker, ed. Flora of British India. L.Reeve & Co., London. 	
 Bentham, G.  1858. Synopsis of the genus Clitoria. J. Linn. Soc. Bot. 2:33-44.
 De Candolle, A.P. 1825. Prodromus 2:234. 
 De Candolle, A.P. 1826. Memoires sur la famille des Legumineuses. A. Belin. Paris. 5:241-244, tab. 39. 
 Fantz, P.R. 1979. Taxonomic notes and new sections of Clitoria. Subgenus Bracteria (Leguminosae). Sida 8:90-94. 
 Fantz, Paul R. 1996. Resegregation of Barbieria from Clitoria (Leguminosae: Phaseoleae: Clitoriinae). Sida 17(1):55-68. 
 Lackey, J.A. 1981. Tribe 10. Phaseoleae DC. (1825). In: R.M. Polhill and P.H. Raven, eds. Advances in legume systematics. Royal Botanic Gardens, Kew, England. Part I:301-327.  
 Mabberly, D.J. 1987. The plant book, Cambridge University Press, Cambridge. 
 Smith, R.H. and G.P. Lewis. 1991. A new combination in Clitoria (Leguminosae -Papilionoideae). Kew Bull. 46:320. 
 White, P.S. 1980. Barbieria. In: J.D. Dwyer and collaborators. Flora of Panama, part. V. Family 
 83. Leguminosae subfamily Papilionoideae (conclusion). Ann. Missouri Bot. Gard. 67:553-555.

External links

Phaseoleae
Fabaceae genera
Taxa named by Augustin Pyramus de Candolle